1st Maldives Film Awards ceremony, presented by the Maldives Film Association, honored the best Maldivian films released in 2008 and 2009. Nominations for the major categories were announced on 8 April 2011. The ceremony was held on 2 July 2011.

Feature film

Short film

Special awards

Most wins
Happy Birthday - 12
Yoosuf - 7

See also
 Maldives Film Awards

References

Maldives Film Awards
2011 film awards
2011 in the Maldives
November 2011 events in Asia